Fighter Squadron 11 (Hävittäjälentolaivue 11, HävLLv 11) is a Finnish fighter squadron located in Rovaniemi, Lapland. It is the operational part of the Lapland Wing.

Organization
1st FlightFighter flight, flies F-18C/D and also trains mechanics
2nd FlightFighter flight, flies F-18C/D and trains pilots
4th FlightLiaison flight, flies Valmet Vinka, PA-31-350 Chieftain, Valmet L-90TP Redigo aircraft

Sources

www.ilmavoimat.fi

21
Rovaniemi